Cinema One (also called C1 and stylized as C1NEMAONE) is a Philippine pay television channel targeted to the Filipino diaspora. It is owned by Creative Programs Inc., a subsidiary of Philippine media conglomerate ABS-CBN Corporation. Its programming includes a lineup of mainstream and independent local and foreign films distributed by Star Cinema, Regal Entertainment (Regal Films) and rarely, OctoArts Films (films solely produced by Viva Films air on PBO and Viva Cinema), film-related programming, and original made-for-television films. An international feed called Cinema One Global is also available worldwide as part of TFC premium channels via cable, satellite, iWantTFC and TFC IPTV.

History
The channel was launched on June 12, 1994, when i-Channel merged with Classic 21 to form Sky 1, launching morning schedules containing public affairs, business, music and mostly Philippine movies. Later, public affairs and business programs were removed from Sky 1 programming and, from there, would form cable news channel Sarimanok News Network (now ABS-CBN News Channel); and Sky 1 was rebranded as the Pinoy Blockbuster Channel on June 29, 1998, with its programming now focused solely on locally-produced films. On May 20, 2001, Pinoy Blockbuster Channel was rebranded again as Cinema One, and added foreign movies to its schedule.

In 2005, Cinema One ventured into original movie production under its annual Cinema One Originals film festival which showcase and grants funding to independent film makers in the country. Among the films that has been produced by the channel were Confessional (2007), Huling Balyan ng Buhi, Rome & Juliet, Tambolista (2007), Mater Dolorosa (2012), Yanggaw, Sa North Diversion Road (2005), Imburnal (2008), Dose, Altar, Baybayin (2012), That Thing Called Tadhana (2014), Ang Babaeng Humayo, 2 Cool 2 Be 4gotten, and Baka Bukas.

In May 2004, as part of ABS-CBN's global marketing strategy, Cinema One was launched internationally focused towards the Philippine diaspora in North America, the Middle East, Europe, and Asia-Pacific.

In July 2021, through a strong partnership between ABS-CBN and TV5/Cignal, Cinema One was added to Cignal's channel lineup with its sister channel Myx as free trial channels and later as "add-ons" for lower plans.

Cinema One Premium HD
Cinema One Premium HD was a short-lived premium channel which showed local films in full high-definition.

See also
 Cine Mo! (sister channel)
 Pinoy Box Office - channel that airs movies by Viva Films with no involvement from Star Cinema
 I Heart Movies
 Viva Cinema
 SolarFlix

References

Television networks in the Philippines
Movie channels in the Philippines
Television channels and stations established in 1994
Creative Programs
Assets owned by ABS-CBN Corporation
1994 establishments in the Philippines
ABS-CBN Corporation channels